Lee Otway (born 4 January 1982) is an English actor best known for his role as David "Bombhead" Burke in the British television drama Hollyoaks, for which he was nominated for a British Soap Award. 
Otway also played 'Ben West' in the BBC drama 'The Syndicate'. He had previously appeared in ITV Drama 'Heartbeat’ and in 2019 appeared in the BBC drama ‘Doctors’.

Otway has a master's degree in Film Production, and received a Royal Television Society nomination for his work directing his masters film.

Acting career

Otway joined the cast of Chester-based soap Hollyoaks in 2001.  His character, Bombhead, was an eccentric character who dabbled in various careers, including a magician, a chef and a priest.

In 2004 he was nominated for the 'Best Actor' award at the National Television awards, as well as being nominated for a host of well-respected categories including 'Best Actor' and 'Best Dramatic Performance' at the 2005 British Soap Awards.

Otway previously appeared in another top-rated British drama Heartbeat.

In 2010 he made his feature film debut In Breathe opposite Ricci Harnett. 'Breathe' won 'Best Director' at the 2010 London Independent Film Awards.

In 2010 Lee reprised his role of 'Bombhead' in the Hollyoaks spinoff, Hollyoaks: Freshers. This led to an internet campaign on Hollyoaks.com entitled 'bring back Bombhead' which led to his return to the show, making a guest appearance in 2012.

In 2014 Otway played the role of 'Ben West' in Kay Mellor's The Syndicate.

In 2019 he appeared as Ethan Ibbertson - the guest lead in an episode of Doctors (BBC 1)

Theatre Work
Lee previously starred in Andrew Lloyd Webber's Evita on its national tour, alongside Marti Webb and Chris Corcoran.

Lee has also worked with Opera North in a tour of the German opera Wozzeck.

In 2008, Lee took part in a modernised contemporary version of the traditional pantomime Aladdin, playing title role at the Lighthouse Theatre in Poole. Due to popular demand, the show reprised its run in Grimsby the following year, with Lee again in the lead role.

In 2012 Lee toured with the comedy play Soap Opera, alongside a host of other well-known TV soap actors.

In 2017 Otway appeared in the plays ‘What Should I be?’ And ‘Our Lives Apart’- Written by Leon Flemming, as part of Bradford’s LGBT celebration month.

Other TV work
He performed as Richard Marx on Celebrity Stars in Their Eyes and won the competition, and in 2006 did extremely well in the television competition Soapstar Superstar due to his large fanbase with £45,000 being made from his votelines. Some said his performance of Richard Marx's hit "Right Here Waiting" was almost as good as the original.

A keen singer, in 2004 Otway appeared on ITV's show, Abbamania 2. Two years later, he appeared on 'Love Island’. In 2007, being a popular contestant from the previous year, Otway performed live playing the piano and singing on Soapstar Superstar Bonus Tracks.

Other work
In 2003 Lee was a guest presenter on CBBC Exchange, recording a segment on Blackpool.

In 2010 Lee, alongside writer Phillip Baron, wrote the pilot episode for TV sitcom That Band. A pilot episode was shot and Macintyre Entertainments pitched the project to broadcasters.

In 2015 Otway was nominated for a Royal Television Society Student Award, for his work directing the TV pilot 'School on Report'.

Awards and nominations
Otway was nominated for a North West Comedy award in 2004 and 2005.

An internet poll in 2004 saw Lee named 'Best Actor' by Hollyoaks.com with a large share of the votes.
Lee was nominated in the 'Best Actor', 'Best Dramatic Performance' and 'Best Storyline' at the 2005 Soap Awards. He was also nominated in the 'Best Onscreen Partnership' category with Alex Carter in the same year.
Lee was nominated as 'Best Newcomer' at 2002 British Soap Awards.

He was nominated in the 'Best Actor' category at the 2004 National Television Awards.

In 2015 Otway was nominated for a Royal Television Society Student Award, for his work directing and writing the TV pilot 'School on Report'. http://www.rts.org.uk/rts-student-television-awards-2014-winners

Personal life

Otway currently lives in Bradford.

References

External links
 

1982 births
Living people
Male actors from Bradford
English male television actors